Heartbreak is a Canadian drama film, directed by Mireille Dansereau and released in 1979. The film stars Louise Marleau as Céline, a woman navigating complicated relationships with her husband Michel (Michel Mondie) and her mother Françoise (Françoise Faucher).

The film premiered at the Montreal World Film Festival, where Marleau won the award for Best Actress. The film received three Genie Award nominations at the 1st Genie Awards in 1980, for Best Actress (Marleau), Best Screenplay (Dansereau) and Best Editing (Marcel Pothier).

References

External links
 

1979 films
Canadian drama films
Films directed by Mireille Dansereau
1979 drama films
1970s French-language films
French-language Canadian films
1970s Canadian films